Robert Arthur Lytton Balfour, 3rd Earl of Balfour (31 December 1902 – 28 November 1968), styled Viscount Traprain between 1930 and 1945, was a Scottish peer.

Biography

Balfour was the son of Gerald Balfour, a Member of Parliament, and his wife Lady Elizabeth Balfour (née Bulwer-Lytton), a daughter of the 1st Earl of Lytton. He was the nephew of Prime Minister Arthur Balfour, and his father succeeded as Earl of Balfour in 1930. Robert was born on 31 December 1902 at his parent′s residence Fishers Hill House, Hook Heath, Woking, and was educated at Eton and Trinity College, Cambridge. He rose to the rank of Lieutenant in the service of the Royal Naval Reserve and fought in the Second World War.

On 12 February 1925, he married Jean Lily West Roundel Cooke-Yarborough (1900–1981). They had four children:

Gerald Arthur James Balfour, 4th Earl of Balfour (1925–2003)
Lady Evelyn Jean Blanche Balfour (b. 22 March 1929)
Lady Alison Emily Balfour (b. 16 November 1934)
Hon. Andrew Maitland Balfour (1936–1948)

From 1952 to 1954, he chaired the Royal Commission on Scottish Affairs, which as a result is also referred to as the Balfour Commission.

External links

References

1902 births
1968 deaths
People educated at Eton College
Royal Navy officers of World War II
Rober, 3rd Earl
3
Royal Naval Reserve personnel